Ferdous Wahid is a retired Bangladeshi pop singer and film director. He made his directorial debut with the Bangladeshi film Kusumpurer Golpo (The Story of Kusumpur).

Career
Wahid started his career in the 1970s. His son Habib Wahid became a pop singer of the country too. Some of his hit songs while starting his career were composed by Anis Z. Chowdhury, Lucky Akhand and Alam Khan.

Wahid retired from music industry in 2020.

His brother, Captain Mustafa Jaglul Wahid, was married to Anju Kapoor - the sister of Indian film producer Dhiraj Vinod Kapoor.

Discography

Solo
 "Mujhe Aisi Ma Dena"
 "Ojana Kon Pothe"
 "Dhup Chaya"
 "Bhalobashbo"
 "Jonmo"

Duet
 "Thikana Bihin Pothe"
 "Obosheshe"

Film scores
 Common Gender

Mixed
 "Tin Pagoler Mela"

References

External links
 

Living people
Bangladeshi pop singers
20th-century Bangladeshi male singers
20th-century Bangladeshi singers
Year of birth missing (living people)
Place of birth missing (living people)